Gunsmoke: The Long Ride is a 1993 American made-for-television Western film based on the series Gunsmoke, in which the main character, Matt Dillon is again played by James Arness.

Plot

The now retired Marshal Matt Dillon is at his ranch enjoying the wedding of his daughter when a posse comes to arrest him for the murder of a man. Assuming that he has been confused with another man, Dillon accompanies the posse back to town to straighten things out, but he realizes that there is a reward of $5,000 for his head.

Cast

 James Arness as Matt Dillon
 James Brolin as John Parsley
 Amy Stock-Poynton as Beth Reardon   
 Christopher Bradley as Josh Reardon   
 Patrick Dollaghan as Deputy Monaghan  
 Don McManus as Jules Braxton Jr.  
 Marco Sanchez as Collie Whitebird 
 Ali MacGraw as Jane Merkel   
 Tim Choate as Sheriff Bart Meriweather 
 Michael Greene as Ike Berry  
 Stewart Moss as Dr. Strader  
 Jim Beaver as Traveling Blacksmith  
Co-starring
 Sharon Mahoney as Amanda Southwick
 Richard Dano as Skeeter Padgett
Featuring
 Ed Adams as Tebbel
 John David Garfield as Skinner
 Victor Izay as Paster Zach
 Dough Katenay as Two Hawk
 Fred Lopez as Deputy Spinoza

Reception
The film won its time-slot with a 10.2/19 rating/share, and ranked 43rd out of 88 programs airing that week.

References

External links

1993 television films
1993 films
1993 Western (genre) films
1990s American films
1990s English-language films
American sequel films
American Western (genre) television films
CBS network films
Films directed by Jerry Jameson
Films scored by Artie Kane
Gunsmoke
Television sequel films
Television series reunion films